Bestyakh is the name of several rural localities in the Sakha Republic, Russia:
Bestyakh, Khangalassky District, Sakha Republic, a selo in  Bestyakhsky Rural Okrug of Khangalassky District
Bestyakh, Zhigansky District, Sakha Republic, a selo in Bestyakhsky Rural Okrug of Zhigansky District